Doğuş is a Turkish name and may refer to:

 Doğuş Balbay, Turkish basketball player
 Doğuş Holding, one of the top three largest private-sector conglomerates in Turkey
 Doğuş University, private university in İstanbul

See also
 Do Gush (disambiguation), places in Iran

Turkish masculine given names